Kelly Overton is an American actress. She is known for portraying Vanessa Van Helsing in the 2016 Syfy fantasy drama series Van Helsing.

Early life
Overton grew up in Wilbraham, Massachusetts, and studied at the American Academy of Dramatic Arts in New York City, where she graduated with their highest honor, The Charles Jehlinger Award.

Career

She has performed off-Broadway, in regional Shakespeare, and on several TV shows.  She began in national television in 2000 in the role of Rainn Wilkins on All My Children for several months. Then in 2002 she returned to theater on Broadway where she debuted in the original stage cast of The Graduate as an understudy for several roles, eventually replacing Alicia Silverstone in the role of Elaine Robinson, opposite Kathleen Turner and Jason Biggs.

After five years in New York she moved to Los Angeles, where she has worked in film and TV. In 2008, with husband Judson Pearce Morgan, she wrote, directed, produced and starred in The Collective. She plays Christie Monteiro in the 2009 film adaptation of the fighting game series Tekken. She appeared in the HBO series True Blood as werewolf Rikki Naylor and co-starred as Ann in "In My Sleep."

In 2016 Overton was cast as Vanessa Helsing, the lead character, in the Syfy television series Van Helsing.

Reception
Of her role as Andrea Barton in the Numbers episode "Hollywood Homicide", reviewer Todd Mason of TV Guide wrote, "Kelly Overton excelled in her small role...". Of her directorial debut (with husband Judson Pearce Morgan) on the film The Collective, reviewer Joshua Tanzer wrote, "The Collective is beautifully shot, well crafted", while Farley Elliott of LAist wrote, "The story, while not frighteningly original, is definitely captivating, and the directing is superb. Kelly Overton, who helped to pen the film, is captivating and you really want to see her succeed".

Personal life
Overton married fellow actor Judson Pearce Morgan in March 2004. In 2011 Overton gave birth to their daughter. It was confirmed during San Diego Comic-Con 2017 that Overton was pregnant during the production of the second season of Van Helsing. Overton gave birth to her second daughter in July 2017. Overton announced the birth of a son in August 2019.

Filmography

Film

Television

Music videos

 Terrified (2010) from Katharine McPhee, as Herself

References

External links

 Kelly's Website

1978 births
American film actresses
Living people
People from Wilbraham, Massachusetts
American television actresses
Screenwriters from Massachusetts
Film producers from Massachusetts
American women screenwriters
American women film directors
Actresses from Massachusetts
20th-century American actresses
21st-century American actresses
American Academy of Dramatic Arts alumni
Film directors from Massachusetts
American women film producers